Beyazıt Öztürk (born 12 March 1969), also known as Beyaz, is a Turkish television personality, standup comedian and actor. He is the host of Beyaz Show, a popular Turkish talk show. In 2018, he became one of the judges on O Ses Türkiye, the Turkish version of The Voice.

Biography
Öztürk was born in Bolu, Turkey in 1969 and spent most of his childhood in Bursa. He is of Georgian descent by his father.

He graduated from the Sculpuring Department of Fine Arts from the Anadolu University in Eskişehir. He started his career as a radio and later  talk show host on television and has also worked as an actor and musician. Öztürk is best known as a talk show host, most prominently of the Beyaz Show that airs since December 1996 on the Turkish channel Kanal D.

Career
Öztürk started his career at Number 1 TV. He began hosting a late night show in 1996 called 'Beyaz Show'. Öztürk also works as a musician and actor and has recorded his debut album called "Beyaz, Türküler" in 1998.

January 2016 controversy
On 8 January 2016, on an episode of Beyaz Show a woman who introduced herself as Ayşe Çelik called the program as a guest and said: "Are you aware of what happened in eastern Turkey and in the southeast? Here unborn children, mothers and people are killed; a large fraction of these criminals are the state and military". Öztürk's urging to people to applaud for this note brought about a lot of reactions. On the following day, 9 January 2016, Kanal D released a statement. It was stated that the person who had called the program had initially stated that she wanted to ask some questions from the artists present on stage, but instead she had done something totally different, trying to provoke a response from the guests and audience which was not the channel's intention. According to the Ministry of National Education the person who called the program was a student. Öztürk also appeared on the Kanal D news to discuss the issue. "I'm the child of a police", I'm amazed and sorry... I could not pay attention to what the caller was saying in live broadcast," he said Bakırköy Chief Public Prosecutor's Office announced that it was investigating Beyazıt Öztürk and Beyaz Show for spreading terror propaganda. It was stated that the person who had called the program during the live broadcast was also included in the investigation.
On 11 January 2016, the person was found living in Diyarbakır and was taken into police custody. Ayşe Çelik was released after being questioned by the police. After all these events, Beyaz Show's new episode aired on 15 January 2016, with Öztürk pointing to his heart in his opening speech and saying: "I vaguely thank the people who know me by their heart". In the following hours, a group of audience started chanting 'Ayşe Öğretmen is not alone' during the live broadcast, and they were removed from the studio. As a result, Öztürk ended the program earlier than usual.

Radio and TV programs

Other works

Filmography

Theatre

Discography

References

External links

 
  Official website of Beyazıt Öztürk 
 Beyazonline.com - His brief biography 
 Who is Who Database - Beyazıt Öztürk

1969 births
Living people
People from Bolu
Anadolu University alumni
Turkish people of Georgian descent